Manga is a department or commune of Zoundwéogo Province in central Burkina Faso.

Towns and villages
The capital of the department is the town of Manga.

References

Departments of Burkina Faso
Zoundwéogo Province